RocKwiz Christmas Album is a compilation album of songs recorded for Rockwiz Christmas specials at the Palais Theatre in 2007 and 2009. It was released on vinyl and cd.

Reception

Sally Browne of the Sunday Mail wrote "With loads more cool Yule songs to unwrap, there's plenty here to make you say 'Christmas rocks!' and not 'Bah humbug!'." The Age's Michael Dwyer gave it 3½ stars saying "RocKwiz presses its real-deal difference with this gritty cull from two past Christmases at the Palais."

Accolades

Album track listing

 Christmas Medley '07 - The Wolfgramm Sisters, Jade Macrae, Joe Camilleri
 Fairytale Of New York - Tex Perkins, Clare Bowditch
 River - Tim Freedman, Angie Hart
 Maybe This Christmas - Tim Freedman
 Christmas Wrapping - Chelsea Wheatley, The Wolfgramm Sisters
 How to Make Gravy - Paul Kelly
 Merry Christmas Everybody - Liam Finn, Jade Macrae, Tex Perkins, Clare Bowditch, Chelsea Wheatley, Angie Hart, Tim Freedman, Paul Kelly, The Wolfgramm Sisters
 Little Drummer Boy - Tex Perkins, Tim Rogers
 Christmas Medley '09 - The Wolfgramm Sisters, Paris Wells, Abby Dobson
 2000 Miles - Adalita
 Christmas Time - Kasey Chambers, Bill Chambers
 Just Like Christmas - Glenn Richards, Holiday Sidewinder
 The Christmas Song - Sarah Kelly, Toby Martin
 Hey Guys! It's Christmas Time - Dan Kelly, Sally Seltmann
 Blue Christmas - Tex Perkins, Paris Wells
 Christmas Train - Vika Bull, John Paul Young
 Christmas (From Tommy) - Tim Rogers
 (What's So Funny 'Bout) Peace, Love, and Understanding - Joe Camilleri, Tim Rogers, The Wolfgramm Sisters

Track 1 is a medley of All Alone On Christmas, Christmas (Baby Please Come Home), Christmas Ain't Christmas (Without The One You Love), Run Rudolph Run and All I Want For Christmas Is You
Track 9 is a medley of What Christmas Means to Me, This Christmas, Who Took the Merry Out Of Christmas, Last Christmas
Tracks 8, 9, 11, 15 and 16 are omitted from the vinyl version.

References

Compilation albums by Australian artists